If I Can't Have Love, I Want Power is the fourth studio album by American singer Halsey, released on August 27, 2021, by Capitol Records. It was written by Halsey, Johnathan Cunningham, Greg Kurstin, and its producers Trent Reznor and Atticus Ross of Nine Inch Nails. Halsey described the project as "a concept album about the joys and horrors of pregnancy and childbirth".

The cover artwork of If I Can't Have Love, I Want Power was inspired by artistic depictions of Mary, mother of Jesus. A theatrical film directed by American filmmaker Colin Tilley, titled after the album and featuring its music, screened in select IMAX cinemas around the world on August 25 and 26, 2021, leading up to the album release. If I Can't Have Love, I Want Power is an alternative rock, grunge-pop, pop punk, and rock record with heavy industrial influence, driven by clattering drums, distorted guitars, and a cinematic texture to its music. Its lyrics center on feminist themes, such as addressing patriarchy and institutionalized misogyny.

Music critics reviewed the album positively, most of whom praised its ambitious concept and theatrical production. Two singles were released to promote the album: "I Am Not a Woman, I'm a God" to United States contemporary hit radio on August 31, 2021, followed by "You Asked for This" to U.S. alternative radio on September 7, 2021. Commercially, If I Can't Have Love, I Want Power reached the top 10 in Australia, Austria, Belgium, Canada, the Netherlands, Germany, Ireland, New Zealand, Norway, Scotland, Switzerland, and the United Kingdom. Scoring Halsey's fourth consecutive record to chart inside the top two of the US Billboard 200 and number one on the Top Alternative Albums chart. The album was nominated for Best Alternative Music Album at the 64th Annual Grammy Awards.

Background 
American singer-songwriter Halsey released her third studio album, Manic, on January 17, 2020. It included the successful single, "Without Me" (2018), the second Billboard Hot 100 number-one song of Halsey's career. In 2020, she contributed to the soundtrack for the superhero film Birds of Prey, with a track titled "Experiment on Me", which is a nu-metal song produced by Oliver Sykes and Jordan Fish from the British rock band Bring Me the Horizon, and released collaborative songs with other artists, such as Kelsea Ballerini's "The Other Girl", Juice Wrld's "Life's a Mess", and Machine Gun Kelly's "Forget Me Too". Halsey was slated to embark on her third concert tour, titled Manic World Tour, in 2020, but after postponing and rescheduling many dates due to the fallout of the COVID-19 pandemic, the tour was announced cancelled on January 23, 2021. She also announced her first pregnancy, with American screenwriter Alev Aydin, after suffering several miscarriages due to endometriosis and undergoing a surgery in 2017.

On June 28, 2021, numerous billboards went up across major cities of the United States, announcing the fourth studio album by Halsey, titled If I Can't Have Love, I Want Power. The singer confirmed it herself through her social media accounts on the same day. Together with the announcement, she also previewed one of the tracks from the album. It was also revealed that the album was produced by American musician Trent Reznor and English musician Atticus Ross, members of American industrial rock band Nine Inch Nails. In a short teaser video, Halsey hinted at the album's punk rock sound. On July 7, 2021, Halsey unveiled the cover art and announced that If I Can't Have Love, I Want Power would be released on August 27, 2021. Halsey gave birth to her child, Ender Ridley Aydin, on July 14, 2021.

Concept and recording 

Halsey stated If I Can't Have Love, I Want Power is a concept album focusing on the positives and negatives of pregnancy and childbirth. The album was originally built around "mortality and everlasting love and our place/permanence", but the emotional impact of her pregnancy "introduced new themes of control and body horror and autonomy and conceit." Halsey also emphasized that it "feels very cool" to have an album with no guest features again, following her debut studio album, Badlands (2015). She said If I Can't Have Love, I Want Power "had to be entirely from [her] voice". The album was a long-distance project, with Reznor and Ross recording in Los Angeles while Halsey sang all of its songs at a studio in Turks and Caicos Islands. Other remote contributions include drums by American musician Dave Grohl in "Honey" and guitar by American musician Lindsey Buckingham in "Darling". Speaking to Zane Lowe on Apple Music 1, Halsey stated she had been wanting to work with Nine Inch Nails for years, because she "wanted really cinematic sort of, not horror specifically, but kind of just really unsettling production" on one of her projects. In an interview with Lizzy Goodman at Capitol Studios, Halsey stated that she started working on the album in June 2020, and that "Lilith" was the first song written for the record.

Music and lyrics 

If I Can't Have Love, I Want Power is an alternative rock, grunge-pop, pop punk, and rock record, with heavy industrial rock influences and an overarching cinematic mood. It also infuses synth-pop, ambient, noise rock, punk rock, drum n' bass, hip hop, and avant-garde elements in its songs. Critics dubbed the album a departure from the arena-pop sound of Halsey's previous albums. The instrumentation of If I Can't Have Love, I Want Power consists of rattling drums, rough and heavily distorted guitar riffs, tinkling keyboard lines, stark pianos, and drum machines. Feminism is the coalescing theme throughout the album, specifically institutionalized misogyny and patriarchy.

Artwork

The cover artwork of If I Can't Have Love, I Want Power was unveiled through video shot at the Metropolitan Museum of Art in New York City, in which Halsey walked through the exhibits before finally pulling away a cover to reveal the life-size picture of the artwork. The cover artwork was photographed by Lucas Garrido. It depicts an artistic rendering of Halsey as Madonna, a category of icons and works of art depicting Mary, mother of Jesus. The singer is seen seated on a golden throne, wearing a purple dress, holding a baby with a towel, with her left breast exposed. She stated that the artwork portrays "the sentiment of [her] journey over the past few months", and aims to uproot the social stigma around "bodies & breastfeeding".

The artwork was specifically inspired by the Virgin and Child Surrounded By Angels from Jean Fouquet's two-panel Renaissance oil painting called Melun Diptych, and became a subject of widespread attention and discussion on the internet. The Mercury News associated the artwork with the topfreedom movement on Instagram "#FreeTheNipple", and noted visual similarities to Cersei Lannister, a Game of Thrones character. However, The Spectator criticized it for appropriation of Catholic art, expressing bafflement with "the complacency of today's Catholics when it comes to the misuse of their iconography." A censored version of the album cover, where the exposed left nipple is covered by the baby's hand, is also available to music streaming platforms. The censored version of the cover was also used on CD and vinyl pressings available at Target and Walmart stores.

Promotion and release 
The album was released on August 27, 2021, with minimal promotion. Its CDs, vinyl records, and box sets were made available for pre-order on July 7, 2021, on Halsey's webstore. Limited-edition red vinyl LPs, with an alternative cover, were sold exclusively at Urban Outfitters. Halsey graced the August 2021 cover of American women's magazine Allure, for which she was interviewed about her social identity, relationships, pregnancy, and family. On July 23, 2021, an online game called "LXXXXP" was launched, which is a choose-your-own-adventure-style platform that encourages users to "choose your path and discover your destiny". The "You drowned in a freezing lake" outcome results in a snippet of a song from the album, which turns out to be an instrumental from "The Lighthouse", track 12. On August 10, 2021, the titles of the album's songs were revealed through Amazon Alexa, which recited the track listing upon asking it "Alexa, tell me about Halsey's new album." The next day, Halsey herself posted the track list across her social media. No singles were released from the album prior to its release. 

Halsey debuted "I Am Not a Woman, I'm a God" and "Darling" live at Saturday Night Live on October 9, 2021, hosted by American media personality Kim Kardashian. For the performance of "Darling", she was accompanied by Lindsey Buckingham playing guitar and providing backup vocals. An extended version of the album, featuring the 2019 single "Nightmare" as well as a reprise of it, and an exclusive track, titled "People Disappear Here", was released on January 3, 2022. ("People Disappear Here" features Mike Garson at the outro but was not properly credited in the footnote. ). On August 31, 2022, Halsey released a deluxe edition of the album, including three demos from the songs "1121", "Honey" and "Lilith".

Halsey performed "Lilith" at The Game Awards 2022 as a joint promotion with Diablo IV whose primary antagonist shares the same name.

Film 

On July 13, 2021, Halsey posted a trailer across her social media to an hour-long film, titled If I Can't Have Love, I Want Power as well, which preceded the album as its companion. The accompanying film is directed by American filmmaker Colin Tilley, who previously directed Halsey's music videos for "Without Me" and "You Should Be Sad" (2020). Actress Sasha Lane appears in the film and is credited as a co-star on the film's promotional material. It is rated R.

The film features music from the album. Rolling Stone reported that the film incorporates fantasy, drawing visual influences from American television series Game of Thrones and the 2006 film Marie Antoinette, alongside themes of motherhood and mysticism in its storyline. Halsey was styled by American stylist Law Roach in the film; Halsey's own beauty line, About-Face, was used for her makeup. The opening of the trailer states, "this film is about the lifelong social labyrinth of sexuality and birth" and "the greatest horror stories never told were buried with the bodies of those who died in that labyrinth."

The film was screened exclusively for one night, in select IMAX cinema theatres. On July 29, 2021, a second trailer, titled "woman/god trailer", soundtracked with lyrics "I am not a woman, I'm a god/ I am not a martyr, I'm a problem/ I am not a legend, I'm a fraud" from the eleventh track of the album "I Am Not a Woman, I'm a God", was released on July 29, 2021. She announced the list of cities in the US the film will be screened on August 25, 2021, and the international cities on August 26, ahead of the album's release on August 27. The tickets went for sale on August 3, 2021. If I Can't Have Love, I Want Power was released on October 7, 2021, on HBO Max. In celebration of the album's one-year anniversary, Halsey released a limited collector's edition Blu-Ray of the film, which comes with the film and a CD of the album, housed in a 64-page picture book of production stills, behind-the-scenes photos, and artwork by Halsey.

Singles
"I Am Not a Woman, I'm a God" was released to US contemporary hit radio on August 31, 2021, as the lead single from If I Can't Have Love, I Want Power. The second single, "You Asked for This", was serviced to US alternative radio on September 7, 2021.

Critical reception 

If I Can't Have Love, I Want Power received positive reviews upon release. At Metacritic, which assigns a normalized rating out of 100 to reviews from publications, the album has a weighted mean score of 80 based on 17 critics, indicating "generally favorable reviews".

Spin praised If I Can't Have Love, I Want Power for its "masterclass in songwriting" and "seductive" production. NME's Nick Levine described the album as an intense, intricate, cinematic, "fierce and fascinating" artistic statement, while Craig Jenkins of Vulture hailed it as "the best Halsey album" for its sound and concept. Sal Cinquemani of Slant also lauded its production, and its "straightforward" themes of "self-doubt, self-sabotage, self-empowerment". Marie Oleinik, reviewing for The Line of Best Fit, dubbed the album a bold and ambitious work of art, with "gorgeous, intense" production that is "never overdone", and admired its simplistic and "breathtakingly tender" songs as well. Music journalist Jon Pareles, writing for The New York Times, said the album is a homage to Halsey's "1990s roots" and simultaneously a strategic turn toward archetypes, eschewing autobiographical lyrics. Luke Morton of Kerrang! said the album is "not a pop record, nor should it be", rather delves into Halsey's punk affinity, solidifying her creative freedom. He added it is a record of juxtaposing moods, where a stream of consciousness connects the tracks to one another.

Jessie Atkinson of Gigwise felt the album displays Halsey's potential and "restrained development in sound". Clash critic Robin Murray deemed it a "powerful song cycle", exhibiting Halsey at her most confrontational, "direct and unbowed". Giselle Au-Nhien Nguyen of The Sydney Morning Herald wrote If I Can't Have Love, I Want Power is a "theatrical, grandiose listening experience" that works as a proclamation of Halsey's identity and artistic intentions, and complimented the sonic diversity of its tracks. Variety Chris Willman picked the album's honest songwriting and alternative rock sound as its best aspects, emphasizing the creative chemistry between Halsey, Reznor and Ross. Helen Brown of The Independent compared Halsey to Pink and Grimes in "bringing a darker, racketier attitude to major-label pop". Brown dubbed the album "a definite power-up", and suggested Halsey could have experimented more musically and lyrically, to "allow the songs to make a deeper mark".

Some reviews were moderately critical of the album. Rolling Stone critic Julyssa Lopez wrote If I Can't Have Love, I Want Power is an adventurous, highly dramatic, and "supremely theatrical" album, that is slightly overwrought at times. Dani Blum of Pitchfork named the album the strongest project of Halsey's career, and praised its experimental production by Reznor and Ross, but felt it becomes "unsettlingly claustrophobic" due to its lack of featured acts. Consequence Mary Siroky complimented the album's production and themes, but expressed mixed opinions about its lyrics; she felt they are, at times, simply "interesting phrases more than they are interesting ideas", but elsewhere, the lyrics "unfold like poetry". John Amen, writing for PopMatters, said If I Can't Have Love, I Want Power has some of the best songs and vocals of Halsey's career, but its "inaptly sleek" production undercuts her connection with listeners. Nevertheless, he felt the album "contains enough magic to be infectious." Kitty Empire of The Observer said the album's 13 tracks "don't quite live up" to the theme Halsey teased, a "Game of Thrones-meets-French Revolution-themed goth rock opera about the Madonna–whore complex."

Accolades

Industry awards 
The album was nominated for Best Alternative Music Album at the 64th Annual Grammy Awards.

Commercial performance 

The album reached the top 10 of the official albums charts of various countries. In the United States, If I Can't Have Love, I Want Power arrived at number two on the Billboard 200, blocked from the top spot by American rapper Kanye West's Donda (2021). The album marked Halsey's fourth consecutive album to reach the chart's top two. It opened with 98,000 album-equivalent units, consisting of 26,500 streaming units and 70,500 sales. Of the 70,500 sum, physical sales comprise 52,500 copies (across CDs, vinyl LPs and cassettes), while digital album sales were 18,000. Additionally, If I Can't Have Love, I Want Power topped the Top Alternative Albums, yielding Halsey's second number-one album on the chart after Badlands (2015), her debut studio album.

Track listing

Notes
 "You Asked for This", "I Am Not a Woman, I'm a God", and "People Disappear Here" are stylized in sentence case.
 "1121" is pronounced "eleven twenty one". "1121" refers to the day Halsey found out she was pregnant–November 21, 2020.
 "Honey" is stylized in all lowercase.
 "Girl Is a Gun" is stylized as "Girl is a Gun".
 "Ya'aburnee" means "may he bury me" in varieties of Arabic, particularly Syrian and Lebanese Arabic, and is a variant of the common expression "ta'aburnee" that means "may you bury me". A term of endearment, it signifies the speaker's hope to be outlived by a loved one they could not bear to lose.
 "Nightmare" and its reprise contain an interpolation of "All the Things She Said", written by Sergio Galoyan, Trevor Horn, Martin Kierszenbaum, Valerij Polienko, and Elena Kiper, as performed by t.A.T.u.
 With the release of the deluxe edition, Apple Music had a glitch that mislabels the demo versions for "1121" and "Honey" by swapping them. This was later fixed.
 The demos of "1121", "Honey", & "Lilith" are subtitled "John Cunningham Demo" on some streaming platforms to signify they were produced by Cunningham before being sent to Reznor and Ross.

Personnel
Credits adapted from Tidal.

Musicians

 Halsey – vocals, songwriting
 Trent Reznor – piano (1, 2, 8, 10, 13), programming (1–6, 8–13), sampler (1, 3, 4, 7, 13), synthesizer (1–5, 8–11), bass (3, 6, 9, 12, 13), guitar (3, 6, 9, 12), vocals (12)
 Atticus Ross – programming (1–6, 8–13)
 Kevin "The Bug" Martin – programming (2)
 Pino Palladino – bass (4)
 Karriem Riggins – drums (4)
 Jack Dangers – programming (5)
 Dave Sitek – guitar (6)
 Lindsey Buckingham – guitar (7)
 Dave Grohl – drums (9)
 Mike Garson – piano (16) 

Technical

 Trent Reznor – producer, engineer
 Atticus Ross – producer, engineer
 Stephen Marcussen – mastering engineer
 Stewart Whitmore – mastering engineer
 Serban Ghenea – mixer (1, 2, 4, 6–13)
 Alan Moulder – mixer (3, 5)
 John Hanes – mix engineer (1, 2, 4, 6–13)
 Mat Mitchell – engineer
 Greg Kurstin – recording engineer (1), vocal producer (1, 6), vocal engineer (6)
 John Cunningham – recording engineer (2, 3), vocal engineer (4, 5, 7–13)
 Darrell Thorp – recording engineer (9)
 Julian Burg – vocal engineer (1, 6)
 Brandon Buttner – vocal engineer (12)
 Tom Herbert – assistant mixer (3, 5)

Charts

Certifications

Release history

Footnotes

References 

2021 albums
Halsey (singer) albums
Albums produced by Atticus Ross
Albums produced by Trent Reznor
Capitol Records albums
EMI Records albums
Alternative rock albums by American artists
Grunge albums
Pop albums by American artists
Pop punk albums by American artists
Concept albums
Visual albums